French New Zealanders are New Zealanders who are of French ancestors or a French-born person who resides in New Zealand.

The French were among the earlier European settlers in New Zealand, and established a colony at Akaroa in the South Island.

Captain Jean-François-Marie de Surville is the first known Frenchman to have visited New Zealand, in 1769, and by the 1830s, French whalers were operating off the Banks Peninsula.

French missionaries and priests also had a significant effect on Catholicism in New Zealand. In 1835, Jean-Baptiste Pompallier was the first bishop of any denomination in New Zealand and was known to be sympathetic to Māori interests at the time. Suzanne Aubert came to New Zealand from France in 1860, and founded the Sisters of Compassion in 1892, a religious order of nuns. The cause for her canonization is ongoing, meaning she may become New Zealand's first saint.

Religion

Source: 2013 Census

See also

Caldoche
Canadian New Zealanders
Demographics of New Zealand
European New Zealanders
Europeans in Oceania
History of New Zealand
Immigration to New Zealand
Pākehā

References

External links
 Te Ara Encyclopedia of New Zealand: French

European New Zealander
New Zealand